XHBON-FM is a radio station on 89.5 FM in Guadalajara, Jalisco, Mexico. It is owned by Radio Fórmula and carries its news and talk programming.

History
XEGJ-AM received its concession on June 23, 1950. It was owned by Radio Tiempo de Occidente, S.A. and became XEQP-AM on November 21, 1964. It was known for several decades as Radio Variedades.

In 1975, XEQP was bought by Organización Independiente de Radio. OIR sold XEQP to Organización PRAM, S.A. de C.V. in 1992. PRAM changed the callsign to XEBON-AM on December 10, 1996. During most of this time, XEBON carried a regional Mexican format known as Radio Morena. Unidifusión acquired XEBON in 1998, and Radio Fórmula picked up the station in 2000.

On April 9, 2018, XEBON-AM conducted its second-wave migration to FM as XHBON-FM 89.5. The station broadcasts in HD Radio and offers four total subchannels, including feeds of XEGAJ-AM and XEDKN-AM and the Trión musical format.

References

Radio stations in Guadalajara
Radio Fórmula